Aloor (Malayalam: ആളൂർ) is a panchayat in the Chalakudy-Mukundapuram taluk in the Thrissur district of Kerala, India. It is near the towns of Irinjalakuda and Chalakudi. Since 1901, the name "Aloor" has been simplified to "Alur" by the Cochin State and Central Government departments.

Administration

Aloor is a revenue village in Chalakudy taluk of the Irinjalakuda Revenue Division in the Thrissur district. Its sub-registrar office is situated in Kallettumkara. Aloor falls under the Thrissur Lok Sabha and Irinjalakuda Assembly constituency.

Aloor Panchayat 
Aloor Panchayat is part of the Irinjalakuda legislative constituency. The area consists of Aloor, Thazhekkad, and Kallettumkara revenue villages. This includes places like Kallettumkara, Thazhekkad, Kombadinjamakkal, Anathadom, Karoor, Vellamchira, Kuzhikkattussery, Porunnakunnu, Kannikkara, Vallakkunnu, Thuruthiparambu, Panjappilly, Urumbumkunnu, and Manattukunnu. The Aloor Panchayat office is located in Kallettumkara, another census town located nearby.

Seat distribution of Aloor panchayath in 2020 Election

History

The Aloor desom in Brahminical traditions is an integral part of Irinjalakuda grama and southern parts of Aloor Panchayat belong to Avittathur grama. From 800 AD to 1102 AD, this area was under the Mahodayapuram Chera dynasty, as evidenced by an inscription of Rajasimhaperumanadikal of the 11th century from the Thazhekad church in Aloor panchayat. From 1342 to 1762 this area was part of Arunadu.

In 1762, the Kingdom of Cochin formed Mukundapuram taluk by adding Mapranam Nadu (Vellos Nad) and parts of Nandilathnadu to Mukundapuramnadu (Muriyanad); it also started Kodassery taluk with headquarters at Chalakudy. Karoor Muir, consisting of Karoor, Vellanchira, and Thuruthiparambu, was part of the Kodassery taluk; the other areas were part of the Mukundapuram taluk. Sakthan Thampuran divided the old Mukundapuram taluk into six properties. They were Thazhekkad, Aripalam, Mukundapuram (Nadavarambu), Mapranam, Palathingal (Nandikkara), and Pudukkad. Pudukkad was used for administrative and revenue purposes.

Revenue villages in Aloor Panchayat, namely Kallettumkara, Thazhekkad, and Aloor, came into existence in 1080 M.E. (1905 A.D.). The Aloor village office is located in Vazhiyambalaparambu, Aloor, since December 1980; before that, it was in Kacheriparambu, Kalletumkara.

At the time of Firka subdivisions villages in Aloor Panchayat fall into two Firkas—Irinjalakuda and Chalakudy.

Language

The first language of almost all residents of Aloor is Malayalam.

Education

A primary school, managed by the parishioners, was established on the premises of the Aloor church in 1894; it is now St. John Berchmens Convent Lower Primary School. In 1942, the first high school, Rajarshi Memorial Higher Secondary School Aloor, was established which was later expanded to include a higher secondary school in 1998. Other educational institutions in the area include Sree Narayana Vilasam Vocational Higher secondary School Aloor, St. Joseph's EMHS, Aloor (Thazhekkad village), St Marys UP School Karoor, Fathima Matha LP School Vellanchira, L F LP School Kombidijamakkal, CLPS at Sholayar near Vellamchira. For higher education, the main institutes nearby are Sahrdaya College of Advanced Studies and Sahrdaya College of Engineering and Technology. Parents with high ambitions send their children to schools in nearby towns like Irinjalakuda, Chalakudi, and Thrissur. The low capacity in the schools in Aloor is one of the reasons for children in Aloor to seek admission in nearby towns. Sangama Grama Madhava, a mathematician and astronomer, was from Irinjalappilly, Aloor.

Many Aloorians, quite similar to other Keralites, go abroad, or to other cities outside the state, to earn their means of livelihood. Many educated youths from Aloor have become successful business owners, IT professionals, skilled blue-collar workers, or unskilled workers, in places such as the Middle East, North America, or in Indian cities, like Mumbai, Delhi, Chennai, Bangalore.

Demographics 

Christian, Hindu, and Muslim religions co-exist harmoniously in Aloor. Up to the census of Cochin State in 1901, there were no Muslims in Aloor, Kallettumkara, and the Thazhekkad muris of Mukundapuram taluk. There were 199 Muslims speaking Tamil in Kuzhikkattussery muri as per the census of Cochin state 1901.

98% of the Christians belong to Syro Malabar Catholic Church; it is in communion with the Universal Catholic Church.

Churches

St. Joseph's Church, Aloor 

St. Joseph's Syro Malabar Catholic Church, Aloor, is the first parish church in Aloor muri of Mukundapuram taluk. The Nazrani community of Aloor built a small prayer hall made of bamboo and palm leaf in the land donated by its members in 1858 and used it for their usual prayer necessities. In 1868, the Aloor church was recognized by the Vicariate Apostolic of Verapoly. Aloor parish is one of the 83 parishes between the Bharathappuzha and Periyar rivers, during the erection of the syro-Malabar hierarchy, and Trichur Vicariate in 1887.  The Syro-Malabar Catholic Eparchy of Irinjalakuda was erected in 1978 and Aloor parish was placed under the new eparchy. Fatima matha church, Vellanchira, St. Thomas Church Anathadam, Vyakulamatha Church Kalvarikunnu, and Prasadavaranatha Church are the parishes separated from Aloor parish. St. Mary's Church, Aloor East is a filial church with a Priest in charge, which is a part of Aloor St. Joseph's parish.

Thazhekad Major Archi Episcopal Pilgrim Church 
Thazhekad Church, dedicated to Marth Mariam, is the first church founded in Aloor panchayath. On the floor of the cross in front of the church is an inscription indicating the church's founding in the year 800 A.D. This community was primarily under the jurisdiction of Ambazhakad and later under the parish of Marth Mariam church, Velayanad. The old church was ravaged by Tippu Sultan's army, during his invasion of Cochin and Travancore, between 1789 and 1791. The church was rebuilt in 1911 as St. Sebastian's church due to the presence of the holy icon of St. Sebastian. The church is famous for the feast of Kurisu Muthappan (St. Sebastian) on May 2nd and 3rd every year. The Archdiocese of Thrissur declared this church as the pilgrim shrine in 1917.

Thazhekad Church Shasanas
The Thazhekad Sasanam (Thazhekad Church privileges) is still preserved in this church. These are the privileges given to the Christian traders and nazrani leaders—Iravi Korthan and Chathan Vadukan of Manigramam—of this place by Rajasimha a Chera King (1028–1043) a contemporary of Rajendra Chola I. The Sasanas are written in the form of "Vattezhuthu" (Kollavarsham, 203–218). The inscription can be dated palaeographically to between the 8th and 10th centuries. The destruction of the port of Thazhekad diminished its commercial importance.

Pilgrimage
The Thazhekad Church was rebuilt in 1911 as St. Sebastian's church due to the presence of holy icon of St. Sebastian. The church is famous for the feast of Kurisu Muthappan (St. Sebastian) on May 2nd and 3rd every year. The Archdiocese of Thrissur declared this church as the pilgrim shrine in 1917.THE eparchy of Irinjalakuda declared the church as diocesan pilgrim shrine in 2015. The church was consecrated as the major archi episcopal pilgrim church by the Syro Malabar Church in 2020.

Infant Jesus Church, Kallettumkara 

In 1861, Fr. Yohannan Chittilappilly, a Syrian Catholic priest who lost his church at Thrissur in Roccos schism, was granted permission by the Vicariate of Verapoly to construct a new church on Thazhekkad property situated in the northern area of Velayanad parish. But instead of reconstructing the ravaged Thazhekad church, he sought the help of the Anti Rocos faction of Syrian Catholics and constructed Infant Jesus Church at Kallettumkara with their support. The Bishop of Verapoly, raised this church to parish status in 1861, incorporating a wider area of Kallettumkara, Muriyad, parts of Kaduppassery and Thazhekkad muris of the then Thazhekkad territory, and parts of Kodakara of Palathungal Proverty .

Other Churches
St. Mary's Rosary Syro Malabar Church, Karoor (1905)
Our Lady Of Fathima Matha Church, Vellanchira (1953)
Our Lady of Grace Church, Thiruthiparambu (1966) 
Blessed Mariam Thressia Church, Sholayar (2006) 
St. Mary's Church, Kuzhikkattussery (1904)
St. Alphonsa's Church, Vallakkunnu (2008)
St. Antony's Chapel, Thazhekkad South (2006) 
St. Mary's Filial Church, Kannikkara (2006)

Temples
Viswanathapuram Sree Subramaniya swami temple
Iringadapilly Bhagavathy Temple
Chembukkavu Bhagavathy Temple
Sreedhanakkavu Bhagavathy Temple, Karoor, Kombodinjamakkal
Aanikkulangara Sree Durga Bhagavati Temple, Vellanchira 
Palappetty Sree Bhagavathy Temple
Edathadan Muthappan Bhagavati Temple, Edathadan Centre

Transport

Rail
Irinjalakuda railway station (IJK in railway lexicon) is located at Aloor and Kallettumkara villages. Aloor natives reach Irinjalakuda railway station to board trains leaving for Chennai (Alleppey-Chennai Express), Mumbai (Kanyakumari-Mumbai CST Jayanti Janatha Express), Bangalore (Kanyakumari-Bangalore Island Express), and many other places.

Road
The traffic intersection at Aloor, popularly known as Aloor Centre or Aloor Junction, is one of the liveliest areas in Aloor. From the intersection, the government-run or private buses can be boarded to major towns like Thrissur, Kodungallur, Chalakudi, and Irinjalakuda. State Highway 51, Kodungallur Road, and State Highway 61, and Moonupeedika Road intersects at Aloor. National Highway 47 is a few kilometers away from Aloor.

Aloor is 25 km away from Thrissur town, the district headquarters of Thrissur; one can board the government-run bus (KSRTC bus) from Thrissur to Mala. Only government buses regularly use this route at full length. The Aloor Junction comes 12 km before Mala. In a KSRTC ordinary bus, it takes one hour from Thrissur; if the bus is a fast passenger, for which the ticket charge will be Rs.5/- to 10/- higher than the normal rate, it takes less than 45 minutes to reach the Aloor Junction. Coming from Thrissur, the order of bus stops within the limits of Aloor is Aloor Junction, Mala via junction, Aloor Gate, RMHS School, and English Medium School. Before entering Aloor, the bus passes through the territory of Kodakara; leaving Aloor, the bus enters the territory of Thazhekkad, Kombadinjamakkal. Starting from Kodakara to a long way after Aloor, this road is part of State Highway 51 of Kerala.

Aloor can be reached from Irinjalakuda and Chalakudi by private-owned buses that use this route between these two nearby towns between 5.30 am and 9 pm. State Highway 61 Chalakudi-Irinjalakuda route touches State Highway 51 at Mala via and overlaps with the Highway till Aloor Junction, and the two diverge. While Chalakudi is at a distance of eight kilometers from Aloor, Irinjalakuda town is nine km away.

Air 
Aloor is served by Cochin International Airport (Nedumbassery), which is about 35 kilometers away. Direct domestic flights are available to major Indian cities like Chennai, New Delhi, Mumbai, Bangalore, and Kolkata. International flights to Middle East cities like Kuwait, Dubai, Abu Dhabi, Sharjah, Manama, Muscat, Jeddah, Riyadh, Doha, and Southeast Asian cities in Singapore and Kuala Lumpur are available. It has a dedicated heli-taxi service and chartered flights.

Geography and climate

Under the Köppen climate classification, Aloor has a tropical monsoon climate. The region lies in the south-western coastal state of Kerala, resulting in a tropical climate; there are only minor differences in temperatures between day and night. 
Summer lasts from March to May and is followed by the south-west monsoon from June to September.  October to November are the post-monsoon or retreating monsoon season. Winter runs from December to February, when it is slightly cooler and windier due to winds from the Western Ghats.

Festivals
Pindiperunnal-Ambuperunnal, or known as the feast of St. Sebastian, is a common festival in all churches in Aloor panchayath. Thazhekad church is known for the feast of Kurisu Muthappan (St. Sebastian) on May 2nd and 3rd every year. Irinjalappilly chengumkavu bhagavathy temple and Edathadan Muthappan Bagavathy temple celebrate Thalappoli with various festivities. Chandanakkudam Nercha on Makaram 16 at the Jaram and masjid at Kombodinjamakkal is widely known in this region.

Notable residents
Madhava of Sangamagrama; mathematician and astronomer

References

Villages in Thrissur district